Robust Principal Component Analysis (RPCA) is a modification of the widely used statistical procedure of principal component analysis (PCA) which works well with respect to grossly corrupted observations. A number of different approaches exist for Robust PCA, including an idealized version of Robust PCA, which aims to recover a low-rank matrix L0 from highly corrupted measurements M = L0 +S0. This decomposition in low-rank and sparse matrices can be achieved by techniques such as Principal Component Pursuit method (PCP), Stable PCP, Quantized PCP, Block based PCP, and Local PCP. Then, optimization methods are used such as the Augmented Lagrange Multiplier Method (ALM), Alternating Direction Method (ADM), Fast Alternating Minimization (FAM), Iteratively Reweighted Least Squares (IRLS ) 
or alternating projections (AP).

Algorithms

Non-convex method
The 2014 guaranteed algorithm for the robust PCA problem (with the input matrix being ) is an alternating minimization type algorithm. Intuitively, this algorithm performs projections of the residual on to the set of low-rank matrices (via the SVD operation) and sparse matrices (via entry-wise hard thresholding) in an alternating manner - that is, low-rank projection of the difference the input matrix and the sparse matrix obtained at a given iteration followed by sparse projection of the difference of the input matrix and the low-rank matrix obtained in the previous step, and iterating the two steps until convergence.

This alternating projections algorithm is later improved by an accelerated version, coined AccAltProj. The acceleration is achieved by applying a tangent space projection before project the residue onto the set of low-rank matrices.

Another fast version of accelerated alternating projections algorithm is IRCUR. It uses the structure of CUR decomposition in alternating projections framework to dramatically reduces the compuational complexity of RPCA to

Convex relaxation
This method consists of relaxing the rank constraint  in the optimization problem to the nuclear norm  and the sparsity constraint  to -norm . The resulting program can be solved using methods such as the method of Augmented Lagrange Multipliers.

Deep-learning augmented method
Some recent works propose RPCA algorithms with learnable/training parameters. Such a learnable/trainable algorithm can be unfolded as a deep neural network whose parameters can be learned via machine learning techniques from a given dataset or problem distribution. The learned algorithm will have superior performance on the corresponding problem distribution.

Applications 
RPCA has many real life important applications particularly when the data under study can naturally be modeled as a low-rank plus a sparse contribution. Following examples are inspired by contemporary challenges in computer science, and depending on the applications, either the low-rank component or the sparse component could be the object of interest:

Video surveillance 
Given a sequence of surveillance video frames, it is often required to identify the activities that stand out from the background. If we stack the video frames as columns of a matrix M, then the low-rank component L0 naturally corresponds to the stationary background and the sparse component S0 captures the moving objects in the foreground.

Face recognition 
Images of a convex, Lambertian surface under varying illuminations span a low-dimensional subspace. This is one of the reasons for effectiveness of low-dimensional models for imagery data. In particular, it is easy to approximate images of a human's face by a low-dimensional subspace. To be able to correctly retrieve this subspace is crucial in many applications such as face recognition and alignment. It turns out that RPCA can be applied successfully to this problem to exactly recover the face.

Surveys 
Robust PCA 
Dynamic RPCA 
Decomposition into Low-rank plus Additive Matrices 
Low-rank models

Books, journals and workshops

Books 
T. Bouwmans, N. Aybat, and E. Zahzah. Handbook on Robust Low-Rank and Sparse Matrix Decomposition: Applications in Image and Video Processing, CRC Press, Taylor and Francis Group, May 2016. (more information: http://www.crcpress.com/product/isbn/9781498724623)
Z. Lin, H. Zhang, "Low-Rank Models in Visual Analysis: Theories, Algorithms, and Applications", Academic Press, Elsevier, June 2017. (more information: https://www.elsevier.com/books/low-rank-models-in-visual-analysis/lin/978-0-12-812731-5)

Journals 
N. Vaswani, Y. Chi, T. Bouwmans, Special Issue on “Rethinking PCA for Modern Datasets: Theory, Algorithms, and Applications”, Proceedings of the IEEE, 2018.
T. Bouwmans, N. Vaswani, P. Rodriguez, R. Vidal, Z. Lin, Special Issue on “Robust Subspace Learning and Tracking: Theory, Algorithms, and Applications”, IEEE Journal of Selected Topics in Signal Processing, December 2018.

Workshops 
RSL-CV 2015: Workshop on Robust Subspace Learning and Computer Vision in conjunction with ICCV 2015 (For more information: http://rsl-cv2015.univ-lr.fr/workshop/)
RSL-CV 2017: Workshop on Robust Subspace Learning and Computer Vision in conjunction with ICCV 2017 (For more information: http://rsl-cv.univ-lr.fr/2017/)
RSL-CV 2021: Workshop on Robust Subspace Learning and Computer Vision in conjunction with ICCV 2021 (For more information: https://rsl-cv.univ-lr.fr/2021/)

Sessions 
 Special Session on "Online Algorithms for Static and Dynamic Robust PCA and Compressive Sensing" in conjunction with SSP 2018. (More information: https://ssp2018.org/)

Resources and libraries

Websites 
Background Subtraction Website
DLAM Website
Documentation from the University of Illinois - Archive Link

Libraries 
The LRS Library (developed by Andrews Sobral) provides a collection of low-rank and sparse decomposition algorithms in MATLAB. The library was designed for moving object detection in videos, but it can be also used for other computer vision / machine learning tasks. Currently the LRSLibrary offers more than 100 algorithms based on matrix and tensor methods.

References

External links
LRSLibrary

Matrix decompositions
Dimension reduction
Robust statistics